Balle Balle Gurmukhi: ਬੱਲੇ ਬੱਲੇ,) is a phrase used in many Punjabi songs to depict a feeling of happiness. It is used in the same way as the English expressions, "Hooray!" or "Hurrah!". It derives from the Sanskrit word भल्ल (bhalla), which means "auspicious, favourable". Both are cognates to the Persian word بله (baleh), which means "yes". 

It is used in Bhangra songs and dances generally set in the Punjab.

References
"Ash goes Balle Balle!", Rediff, 2004-09-15, URL retrieved 2006-12-13. The film stars the Indian star Aishwarya Rai.

Punjabi words and phrases